Red Records is an Italian jazz record company and label founded in 1976 by Sergio Veschi and Alberto Alberti. C. M. Bailey called it the Blue Note of Europe.

In the 1980s its catalogue included Italian jazz musicians such as Franco D'Andrea, Giovanni Tommaso, Gianluigi Trovesi, and Massimo Urbani. Starting in the late 1980s it grew to include Americans such as Robert Stewart, Jerry Bergonzi, Joe Henderson, Billy Higgins, Victor Lewis, Steve Nelson, Cedar Walton, Bobby Watson, and Phil Woods.

In the history of jazz, the exponential development of European independent discography began at the end of the 1960s when labels destined to last over time were born within a decade, and some of them, created from the passion of their founders, have become internationally renowned. It had already happened in the United States with very famous companies such as Commodore, Blue Note, Verve, Riverside, Prestige (acquired then, over time, by the big multinationals). It then happened in Europe with ECM, Enja, Act, Criss Cross and others, including the Italian Black Saint, Soul Note and Red Records. In general, these labels feature in their catalog an important heritage when it comes to sound that helps to document the last half century of jazz life. 

Red Records was born in those years, precisely in Milan in 1976, on the initiative of Sergio Veschi, who spent forty-five years at the helm of this authentic indie label. He was flanked by a well-known promoter, Alberto Alberti, who then remained close to the label until the early 1990s. It was thanks to him that Veschi entered the world of jazz, first organizing a series of important concerts at the State University of Milan (to which Max Roach, Mal Waldron, Don Cherry took part) on behalf of the Student Movement, then realizing the important and seminal review “New trends in Italian Jazz”, and finally founding Red, the culminating point of those experiences. Although the name also had a political connotation, Red actually meant “Registrazioni Edizioni Discografiche”, a brand to which the Crepuscule musical editions were soon added. 

The debut came with the disc Quest by the trio of African-American saxophonist and flutist Sam Rivers, Dave Holland and Barry Altschul. A trio that was at the peak of popularity at the time, so much so that the album is still the best-selling album in the history of the label. The Fratelli Fabbri Editori bought the rights to insert it in its series “I grandi del jazz” (The Great Names of Jazz), selling as many as forty thousand copies in newsstands in addition to the nearly fifteen thousand sold directly by Red. A result reached only by the two records of saxophonist Joe Henderson An Evening With Joe Henderson and The Standard Joe, which in the mid-1980s contributed to the international relaunch of the great black American artist (together with some Blue Note records), which then was settled with the transition to Verve. After Rivers, the focus of the production shifted in particular to young musicians, both Italian and foreign, and to those emerging artists who, thanks to the songs recorded for the label, then obtained great awards. 

In the early years there was a certain stylistic heterogeneity, born of the desire to grasp “the spirit of the times”, to record “the music that is in the air” - which was then a lot - to quote the slogans to which Red has always sought to remain faithful. In the first albums produced we find artists of great importance such as saxophonist David Murray, pianist Anthony Davis, (winner of a Pulitzer Prize for music in 2020, and who debuted alone with Red), violinist Leroy Jenkins, cellist Abdul Wadud, and saxophonist composer Julius Hemphill, all linked to the avant-garde climate of the time. All these are alongside the two extraordinary solo performances by sopranist Steve Lacy, Axieme vol. 1 and 2 and the remarkable Ramblin’ with Bley by the trio of Canadian pianist Paul Bley, who will later release for the label the remarkable and unusual Blues for Red in solo piano. But there were already signs of that interest in Modern Mainstream of hard-bop derivation, the duo between pianist James Williams and double bassist Dennis Irwin, at the time members of Jazz Messengers, italian quintet of the historic trombonist Kay Winding, and to the first record as leader of a drummer of absolute importance such as Billy Higgins, who with Soweto took a position on the dramatic social condition caused by South African apartheid. 

Naturally, there was already a great presence of Italian groups, starting with the blues formations that were very popular at the time such as that of Fabio Treves and the Delta Blues Band as well as artists from the national nouvelle vague such as the Virtuosi di Cave, the trio Schiaffini-Iannaccone-Colombo, the formations of Mario Schiano, the Ziggurats of Claudio Angeleri and Tino Tracanna, then Piero Bassini. The label bet on the latter, a very talented pianist, which resulted in him recording two solo records, Tonalità and Open Form Contrast in the 1970s, Two works that anticipated the talent of this special musician who would later write important pages in the Italian history of the label both with the Open Form Trio (with Attilio Zanchi and Giampiero Prina) and with his own trio, always with Prina, but Furio Di Castri at the contrabass. With seven thousand copies sold of Nostalgia he became, and still is, the label's Italian bestselling artist. Bassini’s records are one of the examples of Red's courageous production line, which has always aimed at offering serious and important opportunities to those young people deserving of attention and, therefore, of investments. 

After all, the broad gaze of Italian jazz is one of the characteristics of the Milanese label’s catalog, which shares its history with that of the development of new Italian talent. Indeed, the very birth of Red is the result of the development of jazz played, spoken, produced and organized in Italy starting from the mid-1970s. In addition to Bassini, whose Open Form Trio found international fame thanks to the meeting with the African American alto saxophonist Bobby Watson, two other exemplary cases are those of Massimo Urbani and Franco D’Andrea. The Roman saxophonist became a symbol of Red’s catalog thanks to his unbridled musicality, groove, deep feeling and sense of swing that animated his music and perhaps embodied, for Veschi and Alberti, the very idea of jazz. From 360° Aeutopia in 1979, award-winning and loved by Italian critics, all the way to the posthumous The Blessing, Red has always supported and promoted Urbani’s music, contributing more than anyone else to the formation of his myth. 

Already an established pianist, Franco D’Andrea joined Red in 1980. He found in the label the ideal place to develop his new artistic ideal, which slowly matured after the dissolution of the Perigeo group. Two superb piano pieces, Dialogues With Super Ego and Es, example of contemporary jazz of European origin, which united new harmonic solutions and a polyrhythm derived from the study of African music. From that moment and for many years, D’Andrea will record regularly for Red, also leading to success the excellent quartet with Tino Tracanna, Attilio Zanchi and Gianni Cazzola, with which he received awards from music critics. However, the Italian front of Red is also enriched by many other artists, of different generations and styles, who together with the names already mentioned, offer a significant historical glimpse of Italian jazz, an essential study of the last decades of jazz history in Italy. 

Giovanni Tommaso, Flavio Boltro, Salvatore Bonafede, Mario Rusca, Roberto Ottaviano, Maurizio Giammarco, the Nexus, Fabrizio Bosso, Fabio Morgera, Salvatore Tranchini, Piero Odorici, Carlo Atti, Nicola Mingo, Michele Bozza, Pietro Condorelli among many others represent a heterogeneous musical world, a symbol of the jazz renaissance that has affected the peninsula in the last half century. Red’s extensive international catalog also needed to find symbolic figures of the editorial line of a brand that Joe Henderson called “The European Blue Note”, not in the sense of a “copy” of the 1960s work of the famous Lion and Wolff label, but of “role”, of jazz conception, of action aimed at searching for those musicians who propose a current vision of making music in that sphere. In this sense, the reference musicians can be identified in Bobby Watson, Jerry Bergonzi, Cedar Walton and the Sphere quartet. 

The former is perhaps the most emblematic name of the label, at least since the editorial line started favoring Modern and Contemporary mainstream. Launched by Art Blakey, of which he was also the musical director, Watson recorded in 1983 the first of many albums for Red (Perpetual Groove, with the Open Form Trio), in which we can already see the link with the great tradition of jazz sounds combined with a torrential soloism, enthralling in the fast tempos, content and lyric in the ballads and with a taste for airy and sunny melodies. Even more relevant were Appointment in Milan, listed by the London Sunday Times as one of the best records of 1986, Round Trip and the records with the American quartet such as Love Remains. The latter has become part of the multimedia juke box of the Kansas City Jazz Museum, considered by the Penguin guide among the best one hundred records in the history of jazz and a top of the 1980s production. Red also documented the saxophonist's only solo album, This Little Light Of Mine, and two records of his formidable 29th Street Saxophone Quartet, certainly one of the most important saxophone quartets operating between the 1980s and the 1990s. 

When he arrived at Red, Cedar Walton was instead an established pianist, a teacher who kept the Powellian tradition alive, updating it, staying away from the seductions that the classical world exercised on a number of contemporary pianists. The three volumes titled The Trio, with David Williams and Billy Higgins, are a still current example of the blackest line of the jazz piano trio. But also the remarkable solo records, duo and quintet (Cedar’s Blues, where the trio is joined by Curtis Fuller and Bob Berg) are equally relevant and highlight the skills of the African American pianist as a brilliant composer. Another influential name among the pianists who have recorded with the label is that of Kenny Barron, protagonist above all with the Sphere quartet, considered by the critic Stanley Crouch to be the most important combo in recent jazz history and specialized in performing Monk’s music (but not only) in a contemporary key, who in addition to bassist Buster Williams counted among his ranks two great ex-Monkians, saxophonist Charlie Rouse and drummer Ben Riley. With Red, the Group has recorded Sphere On Tour and Pumpinks Delight, two CDs in which you can see the linguistic synthesis of fifty years of jazz history created with a stronger feeling and motivations. Barron then left another relevant testimony in the catalog, with the duo with Buster Williams titled Two As One.

Saxophonist with an excellent instrumental mastery, a teacher sought by students from all over the world, member for years of Dave Brubleck’s quartet, Jerry Bergonzi (distant relative of the tenor Carlo Bergonzi) was instead an artistically successful bet, even if his popularity never crossed the scope of “musician for musicians”. His relationship with the Coltranian tradition is among the most complex and original, but it was the depth of his linguistic and spiritual research and the sincerity of his eloquence that aroused Red’s interest. In the 1993 album Emergence, made out for contractual reasons only to the Danish drummer Alex Riel, he created one of the most relevant pages for sax-bass-drums trio of the last half century, while with Lineage he created an impressive saxophone tour, in which Bergonzi meets Mulgrew Miller, Dave Santoro and Adam Nussbaum. 

Red’s international artist list is also made up of a large constellation of leading artists, and among them three saxophonists such as Steve Grossman, whose excellent trios of Way Out East vol. 1 and 2 and Love Is The Thing with the Walton trio are some of the most significant testimonies of the entire artistic career of the American saxophonist, Dave Liebman, whose side most linked to jazz standards was stimulated, and the late Bob Berg, who found his place as a leader thanks to Red. Then there are the aforementioned Billy Higgins, pianists Walter Davis Jr. (author of a valuable solo piano record), Ronnie Matthews and Walter Bishop Jr., heirs of a great boppistic tradition transformed over the years and who you can hear best in their rare leader albums. A particularly relevant element was the collaboration with the drummer Victor Lewis, a master of the instrument whose musical philosophy, defined by himself as Traditional Progressive Jazz, coincides with that of the historic patron of the label, who has repeatedly stressed that “Jazz is tradition in movement; it is a language with rules consolidated over time, which leaves the musicians maximum freedom within a rigorous linguistic discipline”. To these personalities were added those of artists such as Fred Hersch, who has recorded two albums with the ETC group and one with Jerry Bergonzi on tenor sax, Jim Snidero, Dave Binney, J.D. Allen, Robert Stewart, Steve Nelson... Some already known at the time of the recordings with Red while others launched by the label according to its policy of seeking and supporting new talent that has always characterized its editorial line. But the catalog also includes the enthralling groove of the organ trio, such as that of Jack McDuff.

A separate section is dedicated to three great architects of jazz history: Chet Baker, Woody Shaw and Phil Woods. Of the former, Red published the historical Chet Baker at Capolinea, from 1983, one of the best performances of the last season of the charismatic American trumpet player. Of the second, a very little recorded musician, there is the 1983 live in which he is caught in Bologna as member of a quintet in the splendid Time Is Right. Finally, there is Phil Woods, recorded in Europe with one of his best quintets, the one with Tom Harrell’s trumpet in Integrity, and then in a quartet on European Tour Live, with Mike Melillo on the piano, to whom Red subsequently offered several recording opportunities by introducing his qualities as a modern musician yet profound connoisseur of the jazz piano tradition.

Since the Ethnic Heritage Ensemble’s record, Impressions in 1981, we can see the existence of a vein in which jazz subtly nourishes music with a strong “local” component, geographically extra-Western, in Red’s production a glocal soul, which led the production to support a type of jazz conceived far from New York and which took into account a language that was “localized” but also “globalized” because its heart was still American. In essence, these productions considered jazz as a landscape of the soul within local cultures, especially the South American one. Thus, the Latin world is present at various levels in the catalog, starting with percussionists Ray Mantilla and Luis Agudo, a masterful Argentine percussionist who grew up in Brazil and whose albums Afrorera and Afrosamba fully highlight his qualities as a colourist. 

First-rate percussionists Nanà Vasconcelos and Norberto Minichillo, Argentine saxophonist discovered by Red Hector Costita Bisignani, together with the musicians launched at the turn of the new millennium. Precisely with the turn of the century, however, the label had to deal with the progressive reduction of the record market and the increasingly disruptive advent of the so-called “liquid music”, i.e. the one that is listened to independently from traditional phonographic means of sound reproduction. This has led Red Records to modify its production strategies in line with the entire world of discography. 

The valorisation of the superb catalog built in a quarter of a century of work and passion prevailed, in which, as we have seen, there is a significant cross-section of the history of jazz from the 1970s onwards. However, this did not completely stop the creation of new records, conducted according to the usual logic of discovery and enhancement of young or little-known jazz talents. This is demonstrated by the records of musicians brought to the fore by the label, such as the introspective Argentine guitarist of Polish origins Pablo Bobrowicky, who joined Red at the end of the last millennium and, before his premature death, periodically recorded with the label. His work continued that line dedicated to the suburbs of jazz, to geographically centrifugal places compared to the world capitals of this music, inaugurated at the beginning of the 1980s in the line of a third world jazz or ethno jazz, as called by the producer. 

The Cuban-Brazilian trio Mani Padme also belongs to this expressive vein, the protagonist of hypnotic music, more classical than linked to the rhythmic extroversion of the Caribbean and South America. Another is the Venezuelan pianist Edward Simon, subtly tied to his native rhythms but also a refined poet of a jazz with multiple sound and harmonic nuances. Another is pianist, Markelian Kapedani, Albanian of noble origins who brings a folk-Balkan background to his contemporary way of treating the instrument, not without references to the classicism of the 20th century and to Bartok in the first place. Among the new talents and rediscoveries are guitarist Dida Pelled, who had her recording baptism with an exceptional godfather such as Roy Hargrove, while organist Vito Di Modugno and saxophonist Vittorio Gennari, two musicians with a long career but practically unknown to critics and fans, have obtained significant record success thanks to the label’s intuition. There was also continuity with the past thanks to the records of Sicilian pianist Salvatore Bonafede and the all-stars band called Jazz Tribe, with leading characters from the Red world such as Bobby Watson, Victor Lewis, Ray Mantilla. 

This vast and remarkable catalog has been presented, over time, with particular attention to the graphics, elegant and immediately recognizable, far from the stereotypes of so many record labels. Stylized and simple, it is able to propose the topicality of music through the modernity of the image thanks to the graphic choices of Marco Pennisi who, after decades of collaboration, acquired the ownership of Red Records in 2021. The main project is the relaunch of the entire production, above all through its reissue on high quality vinyl which can offer an amazing listening experience in line with contemporary technology. This is a program that focuses on the quality of music and sound in an era where the latter is poorly enhanced by the diffusion of music through computers, iPads, mobile phones. 

But this operation also has another, relevant meaning, because if it is true that for jazz the record is as important as a portrait is to painting, keeping the hundreds of titles in the Red Records catalog available means not wasting an important cultural heritage for jazz history and, more generally, for the entire musical culture of our times.

Maurizio Franco

musicologist, professor, writer

References

External links
Official site

Italian record labels
Jazz record labels